An oxidizer is a chemical that readily yields oxygen in reactions, thereby causing or enhancing combustion.

Divisions

Division 5.1: Oxidizers

An oxidizer is a material that may, generally by yielding oxygen, cause or enhance the combustion of other materials.

A solid material is classed as a Division 5.1 material if, when tested in accordance with the UN Manual of Tests and Criteria, its mean burning time is less than or equal to the burning time of a 3:7 potassium bromate/cellulose mixture.
A liquid material is classed as a Division 5.1 material if, when tested in accordance with the UN Manual of Tests and Criteria, it spontaneously ignites or its mean time for a pressure rise from 690 kPa to 2070 kPa gauge is less than the time of a 1:1 nitric acid (65 percent)/cellulose mixture.

Division 5.2: Organic Peroxides

An organic peroxide is any organic compound containing oxygen (O) in the bivalent -O-O- structure and which may be considered a derivative of hydrogen peroxide, where one or more of the hydrogen atoms have been replaced by organic radicals, unless any of the following paragraphs applies:

The material meets the definition of an explosive as prescribed in subpart C of this part, in which case it must be classed as an explosive (applies to acetone peroxide, for example)
The material is forbidden from being offered for transportation according to 49CFR 172.101 of this subchapter or 49CFR 173.21;
The Associate Administrator for Hazardous Materials Safety has determined that the material does not present a hazard which is associated with a Division 5.2 material; or
The material meets one of the following conditions:
For materials containing no more than 1.0 percent hydrogen peroxide, the available oxygen, as calculated using the equation in paragraph (a)(4)(ii) of this section, is not more than 1.0 percent, or
For materials containing more than 1.0 percent but not more than 7.0 percent hydrogen peroxide, the available oxygen content (Oa) is not more than 0.5 percent, when determined using the equation:

Oa = 16x 

where for a material containing k species of organic peroxides:

 = number of -O-O- groups per molecule of the  species
 = concentration (mass percent) of the  species
 = molecular mass of the  species

Placards

Prior to 2007, the placard for 'Organic Peroxide' (5.2) was entirely yellow, like placard 5.1.

Compatibility Table

Packing Groups

References

49 CFR 173.127(a)
49 CFR 173.128(a)

Oxidizing Agents